The Financial Intelligence Agency is a government agency of the Democratic People's Republic of Korea.

The Financial Intelligence Agency was founded in 2016 to combat money-laundering and financial terrorism.

See also
 Financial intelligence

References

External links 
 

Law enforcement in North Korea
Government agencies of North Korea